The Sony Ericsson T610, released in 2003, is a mobile phone manufactured by Sony Ericsson.  It was one of the first widely available mobile phones to include a built-in digital camera, Bluetooth, color screen, joystick navigation, and was a very high selling model. The T630 was a later variant.

The T610 is available in three distinct colors: Aluminium Haze, Abyss Blue, and Volcanic Red. Many customers of Sony Ericsson in the United Kingdom complained to providers about being unable to obtain the phone in any color other than Aluminium Haze, and to date it is still the most widely sold variant of the phone.  The retro-style design of the phone was created by industrial designer Erik Ahlgren, and garnered appreciation in magazines, at expositions, and among buyers.  The subtle curves of the body were divided vertically with thin metal or aluminum halves, which were colored.  The keypad remained silver regardless of body color variation.

The T610 is a cameraphone that can take pictures in a resolution up to 288 × 352 pixels. It includes 2.5G technologies, supporting GPRS (Class 8) and HSCSD connections with Wireless Application Protocol (WAP) 2.0 capability. It supports polyphonic ringtones in MIDI, and mobile games in Java ME and Mophun formats, and comes with three games.  It does not have built-in handsfree or speakerphone capabilities, however.

The latest firmware version for the T610 is R7A011.

Features

 770 mAh Li-Pol battery and travel charger
 Triband (supports GSM 900/1800/1900 MHz bands)
 Bluetooth wireless technology
 Infrared port with the infrared eye on the top of the phone, next to the power button
 Optional: USB  cable (USB Cable DCU-11 or  USB Cable DCU-10)
 Built-in GPRS modem
 WAP 2.0/XHTML browser; the Internet icon appears when the phone is connected to the Web, using WAP or the built-in GPRS modem
 E-mail
 Polyphonic ringing tones
 Vibrating alert
 Dimensions: 102 × 44 × 19 mm
 128×160 display, 16-bit color (65536 colors)
 PC synchronization SyncML 
 Digital camera, image size: 288 × 352 pixels (CIF) or 120 × 160 pixels (QQVGA), 24-bit color depth (16 million colors), storage format JPEG
 Picture formats supported : JPEG, GIF, MBM, PNG and WBMP.
 Specific absorption rate (SAR) = 0.89 W/kg

Variants

 T616 - GSM 850/1800/1900 version for North America
 T628/T630 - New version of the T610 with TFT display, along with new keypad and case, available in Frosty Silver (white/silver) and in certain markets, Liquid Black (black/grey). It can automatically enlarge pictures to VGA size (480×640). The T630 was released in 2004.
 T637 - Same as T630, but with North American bands (GSM 850/1800/1900).

External links
 Sony Ericsson's website
 Sony Ericsson's wap-site
  Sony Ericsson T610 Forum
 Compatibility of T610 Bluetooth Device with Microsoft Products 
 How to pair T610 in Linux
Sony Ericsson T610 pictures and review

Internet connection

Bluetooth enabled T610 phone as a GPRS modem 
 Internet access via T610 to PDA 
 Connecting a G4 PowerBook to the internet via GPRS with a Bluetooth Sony Ericsson T610

T610
Mobile phones introduced in 2003
Mobile phones with infrared transmitter